The 2006 Anaheim mayoral election was held on November 7, 2006 to elect the mayor of Anaheim, California. It saw the reelection of Curt Pringle.

Results

References 

Anaheim
Mayoral elections in Anaheim, California
Anaheim